Luo Li (born 1976) is a Chinese gymnast. Luo competed at the 1994 World Artistic Gymnastics Championships, winning a gold medal in uneven bars. At those Championships, she received the highest score of the competition, a 9.912, on her way to the gold medal.

Eponymous skill
Luo has one eponymous skill listed in the Code of Points.

References

1976 births
Living people
Chinese female artistic gymnasts
Medalists at the World Artistic Gymnastics Championships
Originators of elements in artistic gymnastics
Gymnasts from Guizhou
World champion gymnasts
Date of birth missing (living people)
20th-century Chinese women